A by-election was to be held for the New South Wales Legislative Assembly electorate of Bathurst County on 19 June 1856 because John Plunkett had been elected to two seats and chose to represent Argyle and resigned from Bathurst County.

Dates

Results

John Plunkett had been elected to two seats and chose to represent Argyle and resigned from Bathurst County.

See also
Electoral results for the district of Bathurst (County)
List of New South Wales state by-elections

References

1856 elections in Australia
New South Wales state by-elections
1850s in New South Wales